Bathycrinus australis is a species of sea lily, a crinoid in the family Bathycrinidae. It is native to deep water in the Antarctic Ocean. It was initially identified as Bathycrinus aldrichianus by Philip Herbert Carpenter following the 1872-1876 HMS Challenger expedition.  It was later distinguished as a new species by the American zoologist Austin Hobart Clark.

References 

Bourgueticrinida
Animals described in 1907
Taxa named by Austin Hobart Clark